Richard Morgan Downey is an American obesity advocate, consultant and editor of the Downey Obesity Report.  Downey is the former executive director of the American Obesity Association and has been actively involved in the obesity field for since 1998.  He organized the first conference on obesity as a public policy issue in 1999, and has testified before Congressional Committees. In addition, he has approximately 20 professional publications and has been featured in the New York Times, the Washington Post and the Wall Street Journal, and interviewed on The Today Show and NPR.

Anti-obesity activism

Downey currently consults with several organizations on obesity issues and serves as the Policy Director of the STOP Obesity Alliance, part of George Washington University's School of Public Health and Health Services, and is a member of the steering committee of the Coalition to Prevent DVT.

From 1998 to 2006, Downey was the executive director of the American Obesity Association (AOA). AOA was an educational and advocacy organization dedicated to promoting understanding of obesity and advocating public policies to combat the epidemic. During his tenure he organized the first conferences on obesity as a public policy issue, especially childhood obesity, secured an Internal Revenue System Revenue Ruling that expenses for weight loss treatment were eligible for the medical deduction on individual taxes; convinced the Social Security Administration, the Internal Revenue Service and Medicare (the Centers for Medicare and Medicaid Services) that obesity is a disease; pushed Surgeon General David Satcher to focus on obesity leading to his groundbreaking Surgeon General's report; and helped to greatly expand Medicare coverage of bariatric surgery.

From 2006 to 2008 he was the executive vice president of the Obesity Society, the medical and scientific society for obesity. While there, Downey initiated a program to develop a credential to recognize physicians specializing in the treatment of obesity and established a section of the Society dedicated to Health Services Research. He conducted a forum in 2007 "What Should the Next Administration Do About Obesity?" co-sponsored by the STOP Obesity Alliance and the National Journal. Nine presidential candidates (Senators Joe Biden, Hillary Clinton, Dodd, John Edwards, John McCain, Obama, and Governors Richardson and Mitt Romney and Mayor Rudy Giuliani) were represented, as was Peter Orszag, now President Obama's director of the Congressional Budget Office, then director of the Congressional Budget Office. The discussions were moderated by Linda Douglass, then with National Journal and now director of communications for the White House health care reform efforts.

In 2008, Downey conducted similar forums at both the Democratic and Republican National Party Conventions. Participating in the forum at the Democratic National Convention in Denver, Colorado, were Melody Barnes, now the White House director of Domestic Policy and Representative John Conyers, (D-MI), chairman of the Congressional Black Caucus. The Republican Forum, held in Saint Paul, Minnesota, was moderated by Lesley Stahl of CBS Sixty Minutes and featured former presidential candidate Gov. Mike Huckabee of Arkansas and Tommy Thompson, former governor of Wisconsin and past Secretary of Health and Human Services. Due to these efforts, obesity was included for the first time in both parties' national platforms in 2008.

In 1999, 2000 and 2001, Downey, at the American Obesity Association, conducted the first conferences on obesity as a public policy issue. The first AOA conference in 1999 featured Surgeon General David Satcher, the first time a surgeon general had directly addressed the obesity epidemic.  In 2000, the AOA conference was the first in which representatives of the presidential campaigns, Governor George W. Bush and Vice President Al Gore, addressed obesity and a survey AOA carried out on the attitudes of both parents to their children's weight.

Communication disorders activism

From 1988 to 1996, Mr. Downey led the National Coalition for Research on Neurological and Communicative Disorders (NCR). NCR successfully worked with the late Silvio Conte (R-MA) to pass the Congressional Resolution, signed by President George H. W. Bush, declaring the 1990s the "Decade of the Brain." Mr. Downey helped establish the National Foundation for Brain Research whose it was to expand understanding of the advances in the neuroscience. The NFBR activities included supplements in the Washington Post and Scientific American and a study on the cost of disorders of the brain. Throughout the Decade, NFBR conducted a number of symposia for policy makers, the media and researchers on advances in neuroscience. NFBR also developed a museum  exhibit with the Franklin Institute and seven other science museums. While in private practice Mr. Downey represented or directed several professional, scientific and patient organizations including the Council of Academic Programs in Communication Sciences and Disorders, the Academy for Neurologic Communication Disorders and the International Neural Network Society. Mr. Downey helped found the FSH Society, a patient led educational and advocacy organization which raises funds for research on facioscapulohumeral muscular dystrophy and continues to serve as its general counsel.

Prior to going into private practice, Mr. Downey was director of governmental and legal affairs for the American Speech-Language-Hearing Association, the professional society for speech-language pathologists and audiologists and worked to include speech and hearing rehabilitation in Medicare, Medicaid, other federal programs, to expand clinical services to children and adults with disabilities, and to expand special education for children with speech, language and hearing difficulties. He led successful efforts for requiring judicial review of Medicare Part B benefits, Federal Trade Commission and Food and Drug Administration regulation of hearing aid sales, the hearing conservation regulations of the Occupational Safety and Health Administration, the establishment of the National Institute on Deafness and Other Communication Disorders and enactment of the Noise Control Act.

Campaign financing activism

Before joining ASHA, Mr. Downey worked for John Gardner at Common Cause on reforms of campaign financing laws, lobby disclosure and open meetings. He was very involved in an effort of Common Cause in Massachusetts to place a Good Government initiative on the ballot. The signature-gathering effort was successful and led to enactment of many of the reforms.

Before that, he worked for Ralph Nader in establishing the reforms of the presidential campaign financing system and lobbying for higher penalties for corporate crime. The Washington Star-News of April 17, 1974 recognized him as one of the four lobbyists "working in a campaign to revolutionize the American system of money in politics."

Anti-war activism

In the early 1970s, Downey was active in the anti-war movement including the Moratorium to End the War in Vietnam in October 1968 and the demonstration in Washington in May 1970 following the invasion of Cambodia and the shootings at Kent State. That summer, Downey began working for Senator George McGovern on the McGovern-Hatfield amendment to cut off funding for the war in Viet Nam. As a conscientious objector, Downey performed alternate service with Americans for Indian Opportunity, a leading educational group for recognition of Native American civil rights. He worked on the legislation returning Taos Blue Lake to the traditional tribe and on the Indian Education Act. During law school, he worked on the staff of the McGovern-Fraser Commission on revisions to the Democratic Party's presidential nomination process. The committee is largely credited with replacing state conventions and party caucuses with presidential primaries to select delegates to the national convention.

Personal
Downey grew up in Brooklyn, New York and attended Xavier High School. He received his bachelor's degree in history from Fairfield University in 1968 and Juris Doctor from the Georgetown University Law Center in 1971. Downey married journalist Dotty Lynch in 2003.

References

External links
The Downey Obesity Report website
STOP Obesity Alliance profile

Living people
Xavier High School (New York City) alumni
Fairfield University alumni
Georgetown University Law Center alumni
Anti-obesity activists
Obesity researchers
American health activists
Year of birth missing (living people)